Magdalen Dacre, Viscountess Montagu (January 1538 – 8 April 1608) was an English noblewoman. She was the daughter of William Dacre, 3rd Baron Dacre of Gilsland, and the second wife of Anthony Browne, 1st Viscount Montagu. Magdalen, a fervent Roman Catholic, was a Maid of Honour at the wedding of Mary I of England to Philip II of Spain in Winchester Cathedral. Dacre, despite being a Catholic, managed to remain in high regard with the Protestant Tudor Queen who succeeded Mary, Elizabeth I. Dacre was, according to biographer Lady Antonia Fraser in her historical biography, The Gunpowder Plot: Terror and Faith in 1605, a fine example of "how the most pious Catholic could survive if he (or she) did not challenge the accepted order".

Early life
Magdalen Dacre was born in January 1538 at Naworth Castle in Eskdale Ward, Cumberland, the fifth child of William Dacre, 3rd Baron Dacre of Gilsland, 2nd Baron Greystoke, and Elizabeth Talbot. The Dacres were powerful Northern Border lords and fervent Roman Catholics, however by the time of her birth, Henry VIII, the reigning monarch, had already made the break with Rome by placing the Protestant denomination on England, and had also just produced a male heir, Prince Edward (later Edward VI), with his third wife Jane Seymour just months prior to the birth of Magdalen. Despite the Protestant Reformation sweeping the country, Magdalen Dacre, along with her siblings, were raised Roman Catholic by her family.

Dacre's paternal grandparents were Thomas Dacre, 2nd Baron Dacre, of Gilsland, 1st Baron Greystoke, and Elizabeth Greystoke, and her maternal grandparents were George Talbot, 4th Earl of Shrewsbury, and Anne Hastings, daughter of William Hastings, 1st Baron Hastings and Katherine Neville. She had five brothers and five sisters. Her father was the English Warden of the Scottish Marches and Governor of Carlisle.

Dacre served as a gentlewoman to Anne Sapcote, Countess of Bedford when she was 13.

In 1553 Edward VI, the boy king who succeeded Henry VIII, died after six years on the throne, aged 15, the same as Dacre. Mary I, daughter of Henry VIII and Catherine of Aragon, became Queen of England, and England returned to Roman Catholicism. By 1554 Mary had turned her attention to finding a suitor and producing an heir to the Tudor dynasty, and became engaged to Philip II of Spain. The marriage took place at Winchester Cathedral on 25 July 1554 and Dacre was selected as a Maid of Honour and took part in the bridal procession.

In E. S. Turner's The Court of St. James, Dacre was described as having been very pretty and blonde. She was also very tall, and reportedly stood a head above the other maids of honour at court. Turner alleged that she attracted the attention of Philip, whom she had to beat off with a staff when he tried to embrace her.

List of siblings
 Thomas Dacre, 4th Baron Dacre of Gilsland (1527/1530- 1 July 1566), married firstly Elizabeth Neville, and secondly Elizabeth Leyburne, by whom he had five children, including George Dacre, 5th Baron Dacre of Gilsland, 4th Baron Greystoke, and Anne Dacre, later Countess of Arundel (21 March 1557 – 19 April 1630). When Thomas died, his widow remarried Thomas Howard, 4th Duke of Norfolk.
 Leonard Dacre (died 12 August 1573). He joined the Northern Rebellion and had to flee England.
 Frances Dacre (b. 1523)
 Anne Dacre (1521- July 1581), married Henry Clifford, 2nd Earl of Cumberland by whom she had six children.
 Dorothy Dacre (b. 1533), married Sir Thomas Windsor by whom she had one daughter, Anne Windsor.
 George Dacre (b. 1534)
 Eleanor Dacre, married Henry Jerningham, Esq., of Cotesby Hall by whom she had issue.
 Mary Dacre (b. 1539), married Sir Alexander Culpepper of Bedgebury, by whom she had one son, Sir Anthony Culpepper of Bedgebury.
 Edward Dacre (d. 1579). He joined his brother in the Northern Rebellion.
 Sir Francis Dacre (d. 1632), married Dorothy Radcliffe by whom he had issue.

Marriage 

On 15 July 1558, Dacre married Anthony Browne, 1st Viscount Montagu, a Privy Counsellor, Knight of the Garter and King Philip's former Master of the Horse, in a ceremony took place at St. James's Palace. Browne was 10 years Magdalen's senior, aged 30 and a father and a widower from his previous marriage to Jane Radclyffe, who died due to childbirth, after the delivery of their twins, Mary and Anthony. Browne's links to the Queen were also impressive, and at Queen Mary's coronation, Browne carried the Queen's train. Due to their links, Mary I attended the wedding. The Browne family, like the Dacres, were also staunch Catholics. Their principal residences were Cowdray Castle and Battle Abbey, both in Sussex. Anthony and Magdalen had ten children.

Following the accession of Queen Elizabeth I to the throne in 1558, Montagu lost his seat on the Privy Council but was made joint Lord Lieutenant of Sussex in 1570. With the return to Protestant Christianity, the Montagus were forced to reveal their stance on the situation: loyalty to the Pope, or to the new Protestant Queen. Browne, along with Lord Dacre (Magdalen's brother), declared that they would support the Pope if he came in peace, but would serve the Queen if he came with war-like intentions. Magdalen found favour with the Queen despite her Catholicism, her former close friendship with the late Queen Mary and later the treacherous behaviour of her Dacre relations, some of whom conspired to depose the Queen and replace her with Mary, Queen of Scots. The Montagus entertained the Queen for a week at Cowdray Castle in 1591, and the priests were kept hidden during the visit. Magdalen was very devout and supposedly wore a coarse linen smock underneath her extravagant court costumes.

Dacre was only once accused of recusancy, and although she allowed a printing press to be set up on her property, she refused to assist or abet treasonous plots against the Queen.

Dacre died at Battle Abbey, Sussex on 8 April 1608 at the age of seventy. She was originally buried in Midhurst Church, where a splendid tomb with her effigy was erected. The tomb was moved in 1851 to Easebourne Church.

Issue
 Philip Browne (born 1559). He is assumed to have died young.
 Sir Henry Browne (1562- 6 February 1628). He married firstly Mary Hungate, and secondly Anne Catesby by whom he had issue; he was the ancestor of the Browne baronets of Kiddington
 Sir George Browne, married Elizabeth Lawe, by whom he had issue. 
 Sir Anthony Browne, married Anne Bell
 Jane Browne, married Sir Francis Lacon
 Mary Browne
 Elizabeth Browne (died after 29 September 1623), married Robert Dormer, 1st Baron Dormer of Wing by whom she had issue.
 Mabel Browne
 Thomas Browne
 William Browne
 Anthony Browne (born 1570)

Ancestry

In arts 
William Byrd (ca. 1540-1623) who had turned catholic some 30 year earlier, composed an elegy to Dacre on the year of her death, With lilies white (1608), which has remained as a famous piece of his consort music.

In fiction 
Dacre appears in Anya Seton's historical romance Green Darkness, which was partially set in 16th-century England.

References

Footnotes

Sources

Carolly Erickson. Bloody Mary, International Collector's Library, Garden City, New York, 1978
Cowdray ruins: a short history and guide

1538 births
1608 deaths
Daughters of barons
British maids of honour
16th-century English women
17th-century English women
Magdalen Dacre
English viscountesses
Court of Mary I of England